The XIII Corps of the Ottoman Empire (Turkish: 13 ncü Kolordu or On Üçüncü Kolordu) was one of the corps of the Ottoman Army. It was formed in the early 20th century during Ottoman military reforms.

Formation

Order of battle, 1911 
With further reorganizations of the Ottoman Army, to include the creation of corps level headquarters, by 1911 the XIII Corps was headquartered in Baghdad. The Corps before the First Balkan War in 1911 was structured as such:

XIII Corps, Baghdad
37th Infantry Division, Baghdad
109th Infantry Regiment,
110th Infantry Regiment, vicinity of Baghdad
111th Infantry Regiment, Baghdad
37th Rifle Battalion, Najaf
37th Field Artillery Regiment, Baghdad
37th Division Band, Baghdad
38th Infantry Division, Basra
112th Infantry Regiment, Basra
113th Infantry Regiment, Amara, Baghdad
114th Infantry Regiment, Müntafik
38th Rifle Battalion, vicinity of Baghdad
Field Artillery Battalion, Baghdad
Units of XIII Corps
14th Cavalry Brigade, Baghdad
33rd Cavalry Regiment, Baghdad
34th Cavalry Regiment, Baghdad
35th Cavalry Regiment, Baghdad
25th Mountain Artillery Battalion, Baghdad
13th Engineer Company, Baghdad
13th telegraph Company, Baghdad
13th Transport Battalion, Baghdad
Border companies x 6

World War I

Order of battle, August 1914 
In August 1914, the corps was structured as follows:

XIII Corps (Mesopotamia)
37th Division

Order of battle, November 1914 
In November 1914, the corps was structured as follows:

XIII Corps (Moving to Third Army)
37th Division

Order of battle, late summer 1915 
In the late summer of 1915, the corps was structured as follows:

XIII Corps (Mesopotamia)
35th Division, 38th Division

Order of battle, January 1916 
In January 1916, the corps was structured as follows:

XIII Corps (Mesopotamia)
35th Division, 52nd Division

Order of battle, August 1916, December 1916 
In August 1916, December 1916, the corps was structured as follows:

XIII Corps (Mesopotamia)
2nd Division, 4th Division, 6th Division

Order of battle, August 1917, January 1918, June 1918, September 1918 
In August 1917, January 1918, June 1918, September 1918, the corps was structured as follows:

XIII Corps (Mesopotamia)
2nd Division, 6th Division

After Mudros

Order of battle, November 1918 
In November 1918, the corps was structured as follows:

XIII Corps (Mesopotamia)
2nd Division, 6th Division

Order of battle, January 1919 
In January 1919, the corps was structured as follows:

XIII Corps (Mesopotamia, Diyâr-ı Bekir)
2nd Division (Salur)
14th Infantry Regiment, 15th Infantry Regiment, 24th Infantry Regiment
5th Division (Mardin)
1st Infantry Regiment, 6th Infantry Regiment, 18th Infantry Regiment
12th Cavalry Regiment

Sources

Corps of the Ottoman Empire
Military units and formations of the Ottoman Empire in World War I
Baghdad vilayet
1911 establishments in the Ottoman Empire
Military units and formations established in 1911